Shivalaya (शिवालय) is a place and older name of Kushma Municipality in Parbat District in the Dhawalagiri Zone of central Nepal. At the time of the 1991 Nepal census, it had a population of 5234 people living in 1076 individual households.

Shivalaya VDC consist the headquarters of Parbat district; Kushma which is even known as Kusumpuri. It is easy to access to two giant rivers Kaligandaki which is famous for river rafting and Madi Khola which has potentiality of hydro electricity. It has even  very famous cave which is virgin to the many tourists of the world "Gupteshwor cave; that is really amazing to the visitors and it has longest distance ever to other caves of Nepal. It takes about two complete hours to visit and come out. Recently the longest and at the height point a suspensional bridge is made which has attracted many tourists.

References

External links
UN map of the municipalities of Parbat District

Populated places in Parbat District